Claude Lavoie Richer (December 22, 1929 – May 18, 2014) was a Canadian cross-country skier who competed in the 1950s. He finished 52nd in the 18 km event at the 1952 Winter Olympics in Oslo.

External links
18 km Olympic cross country results: 1948-52
Claude Lavoie Richer's profile at Sports Reference.com
Claude Lavoie Richer's obituary

Canadian male cross-country skiers
Olympic cross-country skiers of Canada
Cross-country skiers at the 1952 Winter Olympics
1929 births
2014 deaths